Valentina Georgievna Ananina (May 18, 1933, Moscow) is a Soviet and Russian theater and film actress.

Biography 
Valentina Ananina was born May 18, 1933 in Moscow.

In 1957 she graduated from the Gerasimov Institute of Cinematography  (1957, workshop Yuli Raizman). In the years 1957-1990   actress Studio Theatre of film actor. Valentina Ananina   master of the episode, the lists of the most popular actresses of the national cinema has always occupied the first place. The assets actress  more than 200 roles.

In addition to filming a movie, Valentina  working in the children's Sunday school at the Novodevichy Convent.

Selected filmography 

 1955: The Lesson of Life as  Nura, a maid
 1955: Private Ivan as country girl 1957: The Communist as Frosya 1957: The Girl Without an Address as Secretary in the office 1957: The Cranes Are Flying as Dasha  1959: Ballad of a Soldier as countrywoman  1961: Nine Days in One Year as an employee of the Institute 1963:  Walking the Streets of Moscow as saleswoman ice cream 1965:  Time, Forward! as  Member of the team 1965: Children of Don Quixote as parent 1965: Thirty Three as  guests at Lyubashkin family 1966: The Tale of Tsar Saltan as nanny 1966: The Elusive Avengers as villager 1968: The Shield and the Sword as nurse 1970: Belorussian Station as Katya, housekeeper of Matveev1971: Shadows at Noon as  Mironovna 1972: The Stationmaster as Brewer's wife 1972: Big School-Break as episode 
 1973: Matters of the Heart as Road workers 1974: A Lover's Romance as cousin 1974: The Road to Calvary as Hostess with cakes 1975: From Dawn Till Sunset as fellow soldiers of Roznov 1975: The Last Victim as merchant's wife 1978: Siberiade as farmer 1983: Cage for Canaries as  railway worker 1985: Coming Century as teacher 1988: The Noble Robber Vladimir Dubrovsky as Egorovna 1989: It Happened Near the Sea
 1992: Dyuba-Dyuba as mistress of a brothel 1997: The Thief as mother of the prisoner2000: Cast Away as Russian old women 2003: Muhtar's Return as an elderly woman 2006:  9 Мonths as Klavdia Stepanovna, worker hospital 2006: Flesh.ka as old woman in  village Moshkino 2006: The Last Confession as old woman Marusya 2008: And Yet I Love... as watcher 2011: The Best Movie 3 as Utyosov's mother  2013: Vangelia as Olga, Aleksei Neznamov's wife  (at the age of 90 she' s) 2013: Molodezhka as Mikhail Ponomarev's Grandma 2014: Chernobyl: Zone of Exclusion as Evgenia Mikhaylovna 2015: In the Spring Вlooming love as Aunt Klava''

References

External links 
 

1933 births
Living people
Actresses from Moscow
Soviet film actresses
Russian film  actresses
Soviet television actresses
Russian television actresses

Gerasimov Institute of Cinematography alumni